Jumanji (also known as Jumanji: The Animated Series) is an American animated television series based on the 1995 film which in turn based on the 1981 children's picture book of the same name. The series ran for three seasons from September 8, 1996 to March 11, 1999. In 1996, it was carried by the UPN Kids block on UPN, but later seasons were syndicated under the Bohbot Kids Network syndicated block.

Jumanji was produced by Adelaide Productions and was the first show made by that company, with character designs by Everett Peck.

Plot
Judy and Peter Shepherd are two kids that found a board game called "Jumanji". Each turn, the two of them were given a "game clue" and then sucked into the jungle until they solved their clue. They meet Alan Parrish, who was trapped in Jumanji because he had never seen his clue. Judy and Peter would help Alan try to leave the game, providing the characters' motivation during the series. Also, Peter would sometimes be transformed into various animals whenever he cheated, sometimes using the abilities of whatever animal he becomes to an advantage. The kids also free another player trapped longer than Alan. Unlike Alan, he saw his clue but never solved it, but with the kids' help he solves it. He called himself the Master of Jumanji and tried to get other people to solve his clue for him, but once Alan points out that his clue (the Gateless Gate) is an illusion of Jumanji's and he accepts it, it solves his clue.

It's also revealed that like Judy and Peter, Alan would never have been able to survive his first day in Jumanji without help, as he possessed poor survival skills at the time. Ironically, his help came in the form of Judy and Peter from the future (to him anyway) who help him survive and teach him a few of the survival tricks they'd learned from him. In return, the 10-year-old version of Alan helps Judy and Peter return to their time, but later hits his head and forgets meeting them.

In the first episode, Alan reveals that there have been other players of the game throughout time, many of whom left their toys in the cave which is part of his home, but not all of them survived the game. In the final episode, using a crystal that shows the past, the kids and Alan find his clue by observing his roll and what the game said, and figure out why he never saw it: right after he rolled his mom called him to dinner and as he was leaving, the clue displayed while he had his back turned and he got sucked in. Once he knew his clue, Alan solved it with Judy and Peter's help and escaped Jumanji. Outside, the kids decide to destroy the Jumanji game now that Alan's free.

In the series, it is revealed that Jumanji is sentient to a degree and on occasion has sucked in Judy and Peter if they make it "angry".

Episodes

Changes
While the show followed the movie's plot, there were a few changes such as the exclusion of Bonnie Hunt's character Sarah Whittle and the age and relationship of the policeman Carl Bentley (played by David Alan Grier in the film) was changed somewhat.

In the original film and picture book, the board game's hazards would manifest in the real world, while in the animated show, the game's participants would be transported to a world ostensibly inside the game itself, an aspect carried through to the 2017 film and its related films.

Characters

Main
 Alan Robert John Jason Parrish III (voiced by Bill Fagerbakke as an adult, Justin Jon Ross as a kid) is Judy and Peter's companion in Jumanji. He has been trapped in the game since he was a boy and can only get out if he sees his original clue. According to the Jumanji database, he got trapped in Jumanji on April 3, 1972 (although in "Young Alan", he says its 1965 and in the live action film it was 1969). In "Young Alan", he was a ten and a half-year-old boy (although in the live-action film, he was twelve-years old), son of the late owner of a now long shut-down shoe factory and friends with future Officer Bentley. Judy and Peter free him at the end of the show by helping him find and solve his original clue. He tries to get free throughout the series and sometimes succeeds, but always ends up trapped back in the game until he's finally freed by solving his long-lost clue. Alan was freed from the game by pulling a thorn from a lion's paw, which was ironic since he had encountered the same lion not long after first entering the game. In "Nothing to Fear", it is revealed that he considers Peter and Judy his family and that his worst fear is that he has no clue and will die an old man, trapped in Jumanji with Peter and Judy spending the rest of their lives trying to free him.
 Judy Shepherd (voiced by Debi Derryberry) is Peter's older sister. She is smart and gets teased for it, although her intelligence helps them solve problems. Judy also has boy troubles as shown in various episodes. She refers to Peter as "Peabody" a lot. In "Nothing to Fear", it is revealed that Judy has a fear of cockroaches. She also proved capable of great courage and compassion, ready to help those in need; such as in "Air Judy" when she chose to risk her life to help save the eggs and village of a race of bird-people called Jumockis which were under threat from Professor Ibsen in his dirigible.
 Peter Shepherd (voiced by Ashley Johnson as a kid, Cam Clarke as an adult) is Judy's younger brother. It's stated in "Eye of the Sea" that Peter is nine years old. Unlike his live-action counterpart who is shy and soft, the animated Peter is immature, quite troubled and has constant trouble with his sister to whom he often shows disrespect. He constantly says "Cool Beans". In season 2 and 3, this mostly changes to "Nizer". Peter constantly cheats and transforms into various animals such as a monkey from the live action film and other jungle animals (a tortoise, a toucan, a warthog, a frog, a skunk, and a salamander). He can also speak Manji (presumably Alan taught him) and seems to have somewhat of a friendship with them because he saved their leader, Tribal Bob. In "Nothing to Fear", it is revealed that Peter's worst fear is to be seen naked.

Villains
In Jumanji, there are many dangerous characters. Many appear only once or have background appearances in some episodes. These villains include:
 Van Pelt (voiced by Sherman Howard) is the big-game hunter who wants to mount everyone's heads on his wall. He hunts everything, man or beast without remorse. Van Pelt hates Alan and wants to kill him (referred to as human hunting). He also hates it when players call Jumanji "a game". His most commonly used word if anything goes wrong is "Blast!" Van Pelt is killed by Peter in one episode, but Peter becomes him as there must always be a hunter in Jumanji. As a result, Alan and Judy bring him back to life. Van Pelt has poor communication skills. In "Bargaining for Time", it is revealed that Van Pelt even shot his maid at the time when Alan, Judy, and Peter sneaked into his house to obtain his pith helmet for Slick.
 J.H. "Trader" Slick (voiced by Tim Curry) is the sneaky merchant of Jumanji who sells items to anyone who can meet the terms of his transactions and has been known to sell simple tools to rare and powerful artifacts to a vast clientele throughout the series. J.H. Slick lives and sells his wares at a trading post located at the heart of the jungle. He always says his whole name when introducing himself, but his middle name changes a lot of time. Some of the items that J.H. Slick has sold include a rare paint that he tricked Alan into buying, the Slick-o-Matic, a giant potion to make Peter grow and later the antidote, the Chrono-Repeater, a "Get Out of Jumanji Free" Card that was only valid once, a love potion for Judy, and even a motorboat which allows Peter and Judy to return to their time. If necessary, J.H. Slick becomes a real danger to the trio even when paired up with some of the other villains like his occasional team-ups with Van Pelt and Professor J.S. Ibsen. But his biggest part of the series is just a sly cunning swindler (a.k.a. "Honest John Dealership") like how he once swindled Ashton Philips out of his compass.
 Professor J.S. Ibsen (voiced by William Sanderson) is a mechanical genius, Professor J.S. Ibsen is Jumanji's resident mad scientist, referring to himself as a "Master Builder". In reality, he is an android. Tasked to work on behalf of Jumanji, Ibsen operates from a large Industrial Era factory where he designs dangerous steampunk-style machines and vehicles, creating game perils and nightmarish mechanoid obstacles such as battle-armored rhinos, acid-tongued frogs, and biting "berbalangs". Regarding his machinations, he'll transmit nightly vocal reports to Jumanji itself, broadcasting throughout the jungle. In "The Ultimate Weapon", Ibsen was present at J.H. Slick's auctioning of the Transvector of Jumanji (a 'MacGuffin' which is similar to a Lemarchand's box). However, he elected to steal the device rather than outright bid for it, intending to destroy the Transvector on account of its potential threat to the entire world of Jumanji. In "Robo-Peter", Ibsen initiated a master scheme to replace all young people in the "real world" with androids, trapping the humans in the game world. Alan, Peter and Judy thwart this, resulting in the professor's factory being destroyed. J.S. Ibsen's first and middle name initials are a reference to William Sanderson's renowned character J.F. Sebastian from the 1982 Ridley Scott film Blade Runner. Also, Ibsen's surname is a reference to Norwegian playwright Henrik Ibsen and his 1893 stage play The Master Builder, the title being re-used for the title of Professor Ibsen's debut episode "Master Builder".
 Captain Ishmael Squint (voiced by Charles Napier) is the greedy pirate who sails the Jumanji Sea. In "Eye of the Sea", he lost his nose during the battle against the Draken (a one-eyed sea monster which is a cross between a dragon and a kraken) over 20 years ago. Squint's vengeful pursuit of the Draken is reminiscent of Captain Ahab in Moby Dick (his name is a reference to the Moby Dick story in that its first line is "Call me Ishmael"). The monster ate Squint alive before Alan stabbed it in the eye, killing it. In "Return of Squint", Captain Squint later came back alive with two new shipmates. He forces Judy, Peter, and Alan to help him search for treasure at the bottom of the sea with Ibsen's submarine, but got captured by demonic mermaids with his new shipmates while the other three escape. In "The Ultimate Weapon", Squint was present at J.H. Slick's auction for the Trans-Vector of Jumanji. When Alan, Judy, and Peter competed with Professor Ibsen to dispose of the Trans-Vector device, Captain Squint is among the villains that try to reclaim it.
 Mr. Shreve (voiced by Xander Berkeley) is Squint's 1st shipmate who wears an eyepatch.
 Mr. Shatic (voiced by Glenn Shadix) is Squint's 2nd shipmate who has a peg-leg.
 Stalker (voiced by Richard Allen) is the demonic Grim Reaper-like enemy who is the Protector of Jumanji. He's also implied to be the personification of the term "Game Over" as in the episode "The Gift" he is seen holding a dead jaguar that Van Pelt was hunting at the time. This is further enforced by the fact that J.H. Slick, Professor Ibsen, Van Pelt, and a Manji warrior showed extreme fear when confronted by him. He first appeared in "No Dice" when Alan stole the dice from the real world. Stalker wanted the game's dice that Alan stole as if the dice were ever destroyed, nobody would be able to play Jumanji again. He is apparently destroyed when he is crushed by a piston, but is revealed to have survived. In "The Gift", Stalker brought Van Pelt, J.H. Slick, and Professor Ibsen together to kill the kids after Alan was poisoned by a centipede as Peter threatened to destroy Jumanji if Alan died. He is again defeated after being shoved down a waterfall by Alan, but survives again as he crawls out of the river. Stalker's name and purpose was never revealed in the show.
 Ashton Philips (voiced by Dabney Coleman as an adult, Jeannie Elias as a baby) is the greedy adventurer. Ashton Philips considers himself the biggest and bravest and betrays even his agents Alan, Judy and Peter. His catchphrase is "Aston Philips has done it again". Though he was thought to have died in the Temple of Riddles in "The Palace of Clues", Ashton Philips actually survived and resurfaced in "An Old Story" when it came to looking for the Golden Goblet of Jumanjicon. He encountered Alan, Judy, and Peter again in their search for the artifact and even reclaimed his compass that Trader Slick swindled him into trading. After drinking from the Golden Goblet of Jumanjicon, he reverted to childhood form while maintaining his mind.
 Ludwig Von Richtor (voiced by Alan Oppenheimer) is the German hunter who is the rival of Van Pelt. In "Night of The Hunters", he competed with Van Pelt in hunting Alan. In "The Ultimate Weapon", Ludwig Von Richtor was present at J.H. Slick's auction for the Trans-Vector of Jumanji. When Alan, Judy, and Peter competed with Professor Ibsen to dispose of the Trans-Vector device, Ludwig Von Richtor is among the villains that try to reclaim it.
 The Judge (voiced by Edward Asner) is an ape-like lawkeeper that presided over the trial of Alan in "The Trial" when he was accused of stealing the Singing Orb from a cave. However, the Judge is without mercy as he condemns all without regard to innocence. He is also hypocritically greedy as shown when he takes an orb from the Fludgels and is sucked into it. The Judge's only weapon is "Justice" which is a giant gorilla. In "The Ultimate Weapon", the Judge was present at Trader Slick's auction for the Trans-Vector of Jumanji. He threatened Slick with serious charges if it was not the genuine article. When Alan, Judy, and Peter competed with Professor Ibsen to dispose of the Trans-Vector device, the Judge is among the villains that try to reclaim it.
 Flint (voiced by Charlie Schlatter) is an evil wizard created by Jumanji to mess with Judy's mind. Turns people into stone, but is defeated by Judy when she reflects his own attack back at him, freeing his victims and turning him to stone. He is presumably destroyed when his statue falls thousands of feet to the ground.
 Queen Gina (voiced by Cathy Moriarty) is the leader of the Jamazons (which is short for "Jumanji Amazons"). In "Perfect Match", she tries to marry Alan, but is defeated by Aunt Nora. In "The Ultimate Weapon", Queen Gina was present at Trader Slick's auction for the Trans-Vector of Jumanji. She did not take part in the bidding for the device or reclaiming the device. Instead, Queen Gina seemed interested in reclaiming Alan (probably to try and marry him again).
The Jamazons are Jumanji's equivalent to the Amazon Warrior Women Tribe of Greek folklore. They are a tribe of statuesque women huntresses and warriors ruled by Queen Gina. It is unknown if they are part of Jumanji or players that ended up leaving their world behind and became part of the Jamazon tribe, like the Manjis. Their wedding tradition includes marrying only single males while sacrificing the groom immediately into the volcano after the announcement and they never leave male prisoners unguarded. Jamazons are open to challenges, as seen when Nora challenges Queen Gina to free the trio, resulting in Queen Gina being bound and gagged, and Nora scaring the tribe away. In "The Ultimate Weapon", a couple of Jamazons and Queen Gina were present at Trader Slick's auction for the Trans-Vector of Jumanji. They did not take part in the bidding for the device or reclaiming the device.
 Black Ant Queen (voiced by Jennifer Darling) is the Black Ant leader of Jumanji. In "The Red and The Black", the Black Ant Queen was fighting The Red Ant Queen over the Black Bahoot, which was red and black.
 The Black Ant Soldiers are the soldiers who fight for The Black Ant Queen. In "The Ultimate Weapon", a Black Ant Soldier was present at Trader Slick's auction for the Trans-Vector of Jumanji. He did not take part in the bidding for the device or reclaiming the device.
 Red Ant Queen (voiced by Susan Silo) is the Red Ant leader of Jumanji. In "The Red and The Black", the Red Ant Queen was fighting The Black Ant Queen over the Red Bahoot, which was red and black.
 The Red Ant Soldiers are the soldiers who fight for The Red Ant Queen. In "The Ultimate Weapon", a Red Ant Soldier was present at Trader Slick's auction for the Trans-Vector of Jumanji. He did not take part in the bidding for the device or reclaiming the device.
 Sand King (voiced by Jim Cummings) is the sand monster who is the ruler of Jumanji's Sand Kingdom. In "The Magic Chest", he tries to get a chest of cursed gold from Judy, Peter and Alan. He gets defeated by Peter with a squirt gun. In "The Ultimate Weapon", the Sand King was present at Trader Slick's auction for the Trans-Vector of Jumanji.
 Ms. Desmona (voiced by Bibi Osterwald) is the brash, self-entered and opinionated neighbourhood "mean old lady". In "Sorceress of Jumanji", she got sucked in Jumanji after purchasing the game from Aunt Nora. In Jumanji, she gets hold of the Tome of Jumanji that gives her magical powers and turns her into a sorceress. She wreaks havoc until Judy defeats her by snatching the Tome from her, thereby taking her powers, and forces her to solve her riddle to send her back to the Brantford. Alan remembers her from his childhood and admits that he is the one who nicknamed her "Ms. Desmeanie" because of her unpleasant attitude. She has a bull terrier named Killer.
 The Lion was a large fierce lion who chased Alan from the moment he entered Jumanji and has been doing so ever since. He first appeared in "Young Alan" where he was seen chasing Alan when he was 10 years old for the first time. In the last episode "Goodbye Jumanji", it was revealed that the Lion was part of Alan's clue and the reason it chased Alan for years was because it had a thorn in its paw which caused it extreme pain and so Alan built up enough courage to remove it resulting in his clue being solved but not before the lion gave him a "thank you" lick before leaving. Although many other lions have appeared in the show frequently, they weren't the same one.

Others
 Aunt Nora Shepherd (voiced by Melanie Chartoff) is Judy and Peter's firm but fair aunt and legal guardian. She is taken into the game a couple of times, but the kids convince her it was a dream. Later, after Alan is finally freed by Judy and Peter, there are indications of a possible romantic relationship between the two. Nora is a therapist and does aerobics which allow her in Jumanji to defeat the Jamazon Queen Gina. While she thinks her adventures in Jumanji are a dream, they seem to help her lighten up if only for a little while afterwards.
 The Manji Tribe (voiced by Billy West, Maurice LaMarche, Dee Bradley Baker, Pat Pinney, Danny Mann, and Kevin Schon) are fearsome bloodthirsty warriors whom no man they call a friend (although they have shown tolerance towards Alan, Peter and Judy). They are led by Tribal Bob (voiced by Richard Allen). They don't just wear tribal masks, they are tribal masks. It is implied that a Manji warrior can only change back if he willingly removes the mask himself as in the same case with Peter when, in "Masked Identity", he joins them when he becomes more and more enamoured with their lifestyle. It's also heavily implied in one episode that the Manjis were all once humans themselves, possibly child players who decided to stay in Jumanji, finally gave up solving the clues they were shown and sought to leave their own world far behind. Despite the primitive way they communicate and vocalize their native language (which is composed of squeaks, clicks, buzzes, whistles and hand gestures) speaking Manji is very complicated as they have more than 500 words for pain as Peter tells Judy in "Masked Identity". It's notable that unlike the other threats of Jumanji, the Manji are willing to work against Jumanji's interests as indirectly giving Peter the clues to cure a poisoned Alan and actively physically protect Peter and Judy from Slick, Van Pelt, and Ibsen (who were under orders from Jumanji itself to kill the children), and explicitly only try to eat one of the children brought into Jumanji one time after confirming they are not a friend of Peter's (and sparing one they confirm is).
 The Master of Jumanji (voiced by Tony Jay) is a former player who got stuck in Jumanji years before Alan because he couldn't solve his clue. His clue was first seen written on the wall in the Palace of Lost Clues. When he realized what his clue meant, the Master of Jumanji disappeared to his own time and St. Claire in the real world.
 Officer Carl Bentley (voiced by Richard Allen) is a police officer that patrols Judy and Peter's neighborhood. In an earlier part of his life, he was a friend of Alan Parrish and used to work at a shoe factory that later shut down.
 Rock (voiced by Pamela Adlon in season 1, Jeannie Elias in seasons 2 and 3) is a school bully who picks on Peter. He has a group of three close friends named John, Rob, and Jim.
 Dorothy "Dottie" McGrail (voiced by Eileen Brennan) is a flying ace who somehow managed to fly into Jumanji in her plane via a hole in the sky. In "Air Judy", she, along with Alan, Peter and Judy, help save the eggs and village of Jumockis which were under threat from Professor Ibsen.
 The "Banana Brains" (voiced by Kevin Schon, Maurice LaMarche, and Billy West) are a trio of deranged monkeys that reside in Jumanji. Fang, the first small monkey resembles the ones from the film. Brutus, the second looks like a gorilla but with a tail. Dead-Eye, the third looks like a baboon with a lazy left eye and is the leader of the group. They are well known for causing mischief and wreaking havoc for everyone who crosses their path or who ruins their "fun".

Principal cast
 Bill Fagerbakke – Alan Parrish
 Debi Derryberry – Judy Shepherd
 Ashley Johnson – Peter Shepherd
 Pamela Adlon – Rock
 Melanie Chartoff – Aunt Nora Shepherd
 Tim Curry – Trader Slick
 Sherman Howard – Van Pelt
 Richard Allen – Stalker, Officer Bentley, Tribal Bob
 William Sanderson – Professor Ibsen
 Kevin Schon – Dead-Eye, Manji

Additional voices
 Christy Alvarez – Maria
 Beverly Archer – Peter's Teacher
 Edward Asner – The Judge, Repairman
 René Auberjonois – Professor Alsip
 Dee Bradley Baker – Mud Boy, Manji
 Jacqui Bakshy – Rock's friend
 Bob Bergen – Science Teacher ("Brantford, The Game")
 Bob Berger – Science Teacher ("Air Judy")
 Xander Berkeley – Mr. Schreve
 Christine Cavanaugh – Rock's friend, Unibrowed Boy, Cashier
 Cam Clarke – Adult Peter Shepherd, Justin Galloway, Car Salesman
 Dabney Coleman – Ashton Philips
 Jim Cummings – Sand King, Shocker
 E.G. Daily – Disco Boy, Spectacled Boy, Flower delivery girl
 Jennifer Darling – Black Ant Queen
 Andy Dick – Mr. Olsen
 Paul Eiding – Black Ant Soldier
 Jeannie Elias – Sally, Bizarre Aunt Nora, Rock (Seasons 2 and 3), Baby Ashton Philips
 Peter Iacangelo – Lowlife
 Tony Jay – Master
 Bob Joles – Coach Bartlett
 Maurice LaMarche – The Key, Manji, Brutus
 Danny Mann – Umpire, Manji
 Roddy McDowall – Furvish
 Cathy Moriarty – Queen Gina
 Pat Musick – Giant chicken
 Charles Napier – Captain Ishmael Squint
 Alan Oppenheimer – Ludwig Von Richtor
 Bibi Osterwald – Ms. Desmona
 Brian Peck – Red Ant Soldier
 Pat Pinney – Manji
 Michael Reisz – Wade Riley (Season 3)
 Justin Jon Ross – Young Alan Parrish
 William Schallert – Dr. Cahill
 Charlie Schlatter – Flint, Wade Riley, B-Bop A, Luna
 Glenn Shadix – Mr. Shatic
 Susan Silo – Red Ant Queen
 Cynthia Songé – Mrs. Hinman
 Steven Weber – Jack
 Billy West – Manji, Fang

Crew
 Susan Blu – Dialogue Director

Broadcast
In 1996, it was carried by the UPN Kids block on UPN, but later seasons were syndicated by BKN. The series was also shown by CITV in the United Kingdom, TRTÉ in the Republic of Ireland and on Russian RTR channel. It has aired in Pakistan on Cartoon Network in English and currently airs on Filmax in Urdu and on Aruj TV in Pushto.

Episodes of the show are available on iTunes and Hulu. The show was rerun on Kabillion on Demand. The show has also been released through YouTube.

Home media
On August 28, 2012, Sony Pictures released Jumanji: The Complete First Season on DVD in region 1. This was a Manufacture-on-Demand (MOD) release, available exclusively in the US and is part of the Sony Pictures Choice Collection in partnership with Warner Bros. online store. It is also available through Amazon.com and their CreateSpace MOD program.

Mill Creek Entertainment re-released season 1 on DVD in Region 1 on February 17, 2015, followed by complete series on DVD in Region 1 in August 2017.

Notes

References

External links
  - 
 

Animated television shows based on films
Television series based on adaptations
UPN original programming
1990s American animated television series
First-run syndicated television programs in the United States
1996 American television series debuts
1999 American television series endings
American children's animated action television series
American children's animated adventure television series
American children's animated fantasy television series
Animated television series about siblings
Animated television series about orphans
English-language television shows
Television series by Sony Pictures Television
UPN Kids
Bohbot Kids Network
Television shows set in New Hampshire
American television shows based on children's books
Television series about being lost from home
Television series by Adelaide Productions
Works about board games
Jumanji